= Garry Sitarski =

American singer-songwriter and entrepreneur

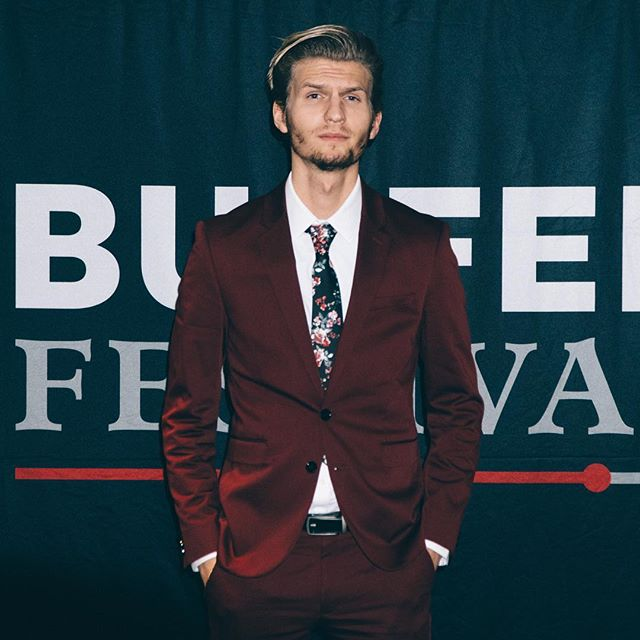
Garry Sitarski - Buffer Film Festival Toronto 2019

Garry Sitarski (born February 18, 1994) is an American marketing director, singer-songwriter, producer, entrepreneur, and Internet personality from New York.
